Abhirami may refer to:

 Abhirami (actress) (born 1983), Indian actress and television host
 Abhirami (film), a 1992 Tamil language drama film